The 2001–02 Polish Cup was the forty-eighth season of the annual Polish cup competition. It began on 12 September 2001 with the preliminary round and ended on 10 May 2002 with second leg of the final, played at Stadion Miejski, Kraków. The winners qualified for the qualifying round of the UEFA Cup. Polonia Warsaw were the defending champions.

Preliminary round 
The matches took place on 12 September 2001.

! colspan="3" style="background:cornsilk;"|12 September 2001

|}

Round 1 
The matches took place on 18 and 19 September 2001.

! colspan="3" style="background:cornsilk;"|18 September 2001

|-
! colspan="3" style="background:cornsilk;"|19 September 2001

|}

Round 2 
The matches took place on 9 and 10 October 2001.

! colspan="3" style="background:cornsilk;"|9 October 2001

|-
! colspan="3" style="background:cornsilk;"|10 October 2001

|}

Round 3 
The matches took place on 10 and 11 November 2001.

! colspan="3" style="background:cornsilk;"|10 November 2001

|-
! colspan="3" style="background:cornsilk;"|11 November 2001

|}

Quarter-finals 
The first legs took place on 20 and 21 November, when the second legs took place on 28, 29 November and 1 December 2001.

|}

Semi-finals 
The first legs took place on 6 March, when the second legs took place on 9 and 10 April 2002.

|}

Final

First leg

Second leg 

Wisła Kraków won 8–2 on aggregate

References

External links 
 90minut.pl 

Polish Cup seasons
Polish Cup
Cup